Giovanni Cavagna (born 30 May 1934) is a physiologist and Emeritus Professor of Human Physiology at the University of Milan.  His research focuses on muscle physiology, biomechanical principles of terrestrial locomotion in humans and other animals, from walking to running. He also studied specialized locomotion styles in Luo and Kikuyu women carrying heavy loads on their head with low metabolic cost, as well as locomotion during parabolic flight simulating Martian gravity. The New Scientist and the Discover magazine covered his discoveries about the mechanisms of imperfect pendular exchange between gravitational potential energy and kinetic energy of the center of body mass. The New York Times reported about his work on backward running, which can potentially improve forward running by allowing greater and safer training.
For his work, he received a Honorary Medical Degree from the Université Catholique de Louvain in 1994 and the Feltrinelli Prize for Medicine from the Accademia dei Lincei in 2000.
He has published several widely cited papers and the book “Fundamentals of human physiology”.

Selected publications

References 

Living people
1934 births
Italian physiologists
University of Milan alumni
Academic staff of the University of Milan